Asquith is an outer suburb of Northern Sydney in the state of New South Wales, Australia. Asquith is located 26 km north-west of the Sydney central business district, in the local government area of Hornsby Shire. The suburb contains a section of Ku-ring-gai Chase National Park on its eastern side.

History
Asquith was named in 1915 after the then prime minister of the United Kingdom, H. H. Asquith.

Asquith railway station opened on 1 November 1915, in conjunction with land released by R. Halloran & Company. Asquith post office opened on 27 September 1920 and Asquith school opened during March 1930.

Wrigley's Chewing Gum factory opened its first Australian office in 1961 in Asquith, and continues to operate from the same site.

Demographics
According to the 2016 census of population, there were 3,376 residents in Asquith. 63.5% of people were born in Australia. The next most common countries of birth were China 4.7%, England 4.2% and India 3.6%. 69.5% of people spoke only English at home. Other languages spoken at home included Mandarin at 6.2%. The most common responses for religious affiliation were No Religion 29.7%, Catholic 21.4% and Anglican 17.0%.

Education
Asquith is home to Asquith Public School which opened in 1930 and is located in Dudley Street and St Patrick's Primary school opened in 1958 and is located in Royston Parade.

Asquith also has two single-sex state high schools: Asquith Boys High School (established 1960) is located on the Pacific Highway and Asquith Girls High School (established 1959) is located in Stokes Avenue.

Transport
Asquith railway station is on the North Shore & Western Line of the Sydney Trains network.

Hornsby Maintenance Depot, a large train depot, is within the suburb.

Sport
 Asquith Bowling Club was established in 1950 and is located in Lodge Street Hornsby, next door to Storey Park. The club has three greens for its bowling members. Within the club it has an Australian Bistro, full bar facilities, poker machines and TAB facilities.
 Asquith Cricket Club currently plays in the Hornsby Kuring gai and Hills District Cricket Association Competition. Its home ground is Storey Park in Lodge Street Hornsby. The club has enjoyed excellent success in the A Grade competition by winning six consecutive premierships during the Summer seasons of 2005/06, 06/07, 07/08, 08/09, 09/10, 10/11. The team again made the Grand Final in the season of 2011/12 before losing to West Pennant Hills. The club caters for juniors to adults.
 Asquith Golf Club was officially opened on 18 June 1938. Its layout has changed over the years and currently is a Par 70 layout. It has enjoyed great success within competitions run by the NSW Golf Association. The club has won the Male Junior Pennant in 1964, the Male Eric Apperley Shield U23 in 1969, 74, 75, and the Mixed Pennant Competition in 1988,89,90,91,97,11.
 Asquith Magpies Rugby league club was formed in 1953. The club's home ground is at Storey Park in Lodge Street Hornsby, with the club situated in Alexandria Parade Waitara.  The Club caters for players from Under 6 to All Age.  The club's Under 6's to Under 12's compete in the North Sydney Junior Rugby League competition.  The club's Under 13's to Under 19's, plus their A-grade team compete in the combined North Sydney-Manly Junior Rugby League competition.  Asquith also fields teams in the Ron Massey Cup and Sydney Shield, where they serve as a feeder club to the North Sydney Bears New South Wales Cup team.
 Asquith Soccer club was formed in 1969. Its home ground is Asquith Park in Mills Avenue, Asquith. The First Grade team won its first major trophy in the Kuring gai District Soccer Association by taking out the KDSA Cup in 1979. Since then the First Grade team has won the Premier League title a total of six times including a Soccer District record of five consecutively. This being in 2002,03,04,05,06 and then a sixth title in 2009. The club caters for players from Under 6 to All Age.

Notable residents
 Graham Bidstrup, Member of The Angels
 Stan Stokes, Author of Memories of Asquith

Gallery

References

External links
  [CC-By-SA]

See also
 Ku-ring-gai Chase National Park

 
Suburbs of Sydney